Gespräche mit Goethe (translation: Conversations with Goethe, Conversations with Eckermann) is a book by Johann Peter Eckermann recording his conversations with Johann Wolfgang von Goethe during the last nine years of the latter's life, while Eckermann served as Goethe's personal secretary. It was first released (in two volumes) in 1836 and substantially augmented (with the addition of another volume) in 1848.

Eckermann published the book at a time when Goethe's popularity was diminishing in Germany, and the book initially sold poorly there. It rapidly became very popular among international readers and subsequently played an important role in reviving interest in and appreciation of Goethe's work both in Germany and around the world.

Some editions go so far as to publish the book as Conversations with Eckermann, with Goethe listed as the author. This practice mistakenly implies Eckermann played a role of editor rather than author; on the contrary, the book is very frank about its point of view. Eckermann includes much autobiographical material and clearly states that his "conversations" are not word-for-word transcriptions, but reconstructions based on memory.

Samples

Translations and influence 
Margaret Fuller translated the first volume into English in 1839 to great acclaim, though a later translator, John Oxenford, complained that "the frequent omissions render it almost an abridgement." Subsequent translators, however, have taken great liberty with Eckermann's work, greatly reducing the autobiographical material and substantially altering his prose, rather than offering faithful renderings in English.

Friedrich Nietzsche called it "the best German book there is [dem besten deutschen Buche, das es gibt]." It is frequently compared to Boswell's Life of Johnson. Jorge Luis Borges thinks that the two books are "in no way comparable", because Boswell's lively character is vital to his book, whereas

Notes

External links
Conversations Of Goethe, translated into English by John Oxenford

1836 books
Works about Johann Wolfgang von Goethe